Benjamin Douglas Hudson (born September 11, 1964 in Memphis, Tennessee) is a former professional American football quarterback for the Kansas City Chiefs of the National Football League (NFL). He graduated from Gulf Breeze High School and played collegiate football at Nicholls State University

Hudson is best known for a one-play gaffe resulting in a safety. It is the only recorded statistic of his career.

Hudson, selected by Kansas City in the 1987 NFL Draft, was the last quarterback drafted by the Chiefs to start a game until Brodie Croyle started in 2007. Hudson was one of five quarterbacks to start a game for the Chiefs in 1987 following a strike by the National Football League Players Association.

Hudson played only five minutes in his only game against the Denver Broncos, and he threw one pass for an incompletion. He was tackled by the Broncos' Jim Ryan, and fumbled the hand-off in the end zone. Hudson recovered the ball but it was recorded as a safety. The next time the Chiefs had the ball, Hudson was replaced at quarterback by Matt Stevens and Hudson never played another game in the league.

References

External links
Nicholls State bio
NFL bio

1964 births
Living people
Players of American football from Memphis, Tennessee
American football quarterbacks
Nicholls Colonels football players
Kansas City Chiefs players
National Football League replacement players